The St. Croix River Hounds are a planned collegiate summer baseball team intended to play in the Northwoods League. The team ownership group includes former Major League Baseball players Tom Quinlan and Robb Quinlan.

It was first reported in July 2017 that the team could begin play in the 2018 season. In October 2017, that slipped to 2019; in October 2018, to 2020; and in October 2019, to 2021. , ballpark construction had not begun, but the team still expressed "the intention to begin the build this year." In July 2022, a revised development plan was presented that would call for a 1,400 seat facility that could open as soon as June 2023. The River Hounds were still not listed in the Northwoods League schedule for 2023.

References

External links
 St. Croix River Hounds website
 Northwoods League website

Northwoods League teams
Sports in Eau Claire, Wisconsin
Amateur baseball teams in Wisconsin
Tourist attractions in St. Croix County, Wisconsin
2017 establishments in Wisconsin